The New Haven Armory (also known as the Goffe Street Armory) is a historic building at 270–290 Goffe Street in the Dixwell neighborhood of New Haven, Connecticut, United States.  Developed between 1928 and 1930, the armory served the Connecticut National Guard  and the Second Company Governor's Foot Guard. It has also served as a venue for concerts, events and  other civic functions in the community.

Description and history
The building was designed by Payne and Keefe. It is a fortress-like structure with a red brick exterior in a Romanesque revival style. The building consists of three main parts: a vast vaulted drill hall, a surrounding U-shaped head house, and an extending wing on the west. The four-story entry tower of the headhouse dominates the facade, with "state armory" engraved near the top. The building features basket-weave brickwork, arches, corbelling, and a molded cornice. The enormous  interior space has meeting rooms, offices, lounges and a lobby area.

The building has served as a venue for dog, antique and boat shows, as well as exhibitions and concerts, with artists including Frank Sinatra and the Tommy Dorsey Band.  A home show held at the armory in the 1940s included a full-sized Cape Cod house. It played a role during the New Haven Black Panther trials in 1970 as the staging ground for the National Guard response to protests. Annual "Black Expos" were held at the armory in the 1970s to promote and discuss economic, political, and social concerns important to the African-American community.

Ownership was transferred to the City of New Haven in 2009 when both guard units moved to other facilities and the armory was deemed surplus.  Efforts to secure funds so that the building can be renovated to serve the community are ongoing.  The property was listed on the National Register of Historic Places in 2021.

See also
National Register of Historic Places listings in New Haven, Connecticut

References

Buildings and structures in New Haven, Connecticut
National Register of Historic Places in New Haven, Connecticut
Armories on the National Register of Historic Places in Connecticut
Romanesque Revival architecture in Connecticut
Buildings and structures completed in 1930